Abdel Aziz Boukar Moussa (born 8 April 1980 in Chad) is a Chadian-born Angolan basketball center. He is a former member of the Angola national basketball team, and competed for Angola at the 2004 Summer Olympics, 2005 African Championship, 2006 Lusophony Games and 2006 FIBA World Championship. He stands .

He last played for Recreativo do Libolo at the Angolan major basketball league BAI Basket.

Personal
Moussa grew up in Chad and acquired Angolan citizenship in 2001.

References

External links
 
 Profile Yahoo! Sports

1980 births
Living people
Angolan men's basketball players
Basketball players at the 2004 Summer Olympics
Basketball players at the 2008 Summer Olympics
Olympic basketball players of Angola
People from N'Djamena
Atlético Petróleos de Luanda basketball players
Atlético Sport Aviação basketball players
C.D. Primeiro de Agosto men's basketball players
C.R.D. Libolo basketball players
S.L. Benfica basketball players
Centers (basketball)
African Games gold medalists for Angola
African Games medalists in basketball
2006 FIBA World Championship players
Competitors at the 2003 All-Africa Games